Elg or ELG may refer to:

People 
 Jarno Elg (born 1975), Finnish convict
 Taina Elg (born 1930), Finnish-American actress and dancer
 Øivind Elgenes (born 1958), Norwegian singer

Transportation 
 El Golea Airport, in Algeria
 Elgin railway station, in Scotland
 Alpi Eagles, an Italian airline

Other uses 
 Effluent limitation guidelines
 ElGamal encryption